Xgħajra is a small village in the South Eastern Region of Malta. It is located on the coast, about halfway between Valletta and Marsaskala. Its local football club is known as the Xgħajra Tornadoes F.C. Contrary to popular belief, it has no relation to the Gozitan village Xagħra. Its population stood at 1,732 in March 2014.

Local Council
The current local council members are:
Attard, Neil (Sindku)- PL
Pulis, Rosabelle (vici Sindku)- PL
Valvo, Anthony- PL
Camilleri, Raymond- PL
Borġ, Doris - PN

Zones
San Pietru 
Ta' Alessi
Ta' Maġġi 
Tal-Qassisin  
Tan-Nisa 
Tumbrell 
Wied Glavan

Main Roads
Dawret ix-Xatt (Strand By-Pass)
Triq Ħaż-Żabbar (Zabbar Road)
Triq il-Fortizza tal-Grazzja (Grazzia Fort Street)
Triq il-Knisja (Church Street)
Triq it-Torri ta' Alof de Wignacourt (Alof de Wignacourt Tower Street). This road refers to the Santa Maria delle Grazie Tower which the Knights of Malta erected in 1620 during the reign of Grand Master Fra Alof de Wignacourt, which was one of the set of Wignacourt towers. The British demolished the tower to clear a field of fire for the Della Grazie Battery which they constructed in 1888.

Twin towns – sister cities

Xgħajra is twinned with:
 Colletorto, Italy
 Le Fauga, France
 Pelplin, Poland

References

 
Towns in Malta
Local councils of Malta